Raees Ahmadzai رئیس احمدزی (born 3 September 1984) is an Afghan former cricketer who represented the Afghanistan national cricket team until his retirement in May 2010. Ahmadzai is a right-handed batsman who bowls right-arm off break. He is also UNICEF National Goodwill Ambassador.

Early and personal life
Ahmadzai was born in the village of Azra, Logar Province, Afghanistan. He is from the Kuchi tribe, along with former teammates Mohammad Nabi and Dawlat Ahmadzai. He is far from certain about his age. In an interview in Potchefstroom with Will Luke in April 2009, he said, "Talking to my mother, she works out my age by seeing who the president was. Unofficially I'm nearly 25, give or take three years. Or four. I could be 21 or 28." Luke's own opinion, going by "Deep-set wrinkles and a calm demeanour", was twenty-eight. The general consensus from Cricinfo and CricketArchive is that he was born on 3 September 1984.

Ahmadzai spent much of his early years in refugee camps with his family, fleeing from the Soviet invasion of Afghanistan and the subsequent Civil War that followed the Soviet withdrawal. Ahmadzai, like many of his teammates learnt the game in neighbouring Pakistan, in Ahmadzai's case in a Peshawar schoolyard.

Career
Ahmadzai made his debut for Afghanistan against Rahim Yar Khan in the 2002/3 Cornelius Trophy. Ahmadzai made his international debut for Afghanistan against Hong Kong in the 2004 ACC Trophy. Ahmadzai represented Afghanistan in the following tournament in 2006. During the 2006 tournament, Ahmadzai captained the side.

In 2007, Ahmadzai played two List-A matches for the Sebastianites Cricket and Athletic Club in Sri Lanka, playing matches against Lankan Cricket Club and the Sri Lanka Army Sports Club.

Ahmadzai was part of the rapidly rising Afghan team that from 2008 to 2009 won the World Cricket League Division Five, Division Four and Division Three, thus promoting them to Division Two and allowing them to partake in the 2009 ICC World Cup Qualifier.

During the qualifier, Ahmadzai made his List-A debut for Afghanistan against Denmark. During the same tournament Afghanistan gained ODI status, with Ahmadzai making his One Day International debut against Scotland, where he scored 39 runs, helping Afghanistan to an 89 run victory.

Ahmadzai made his first class debut in the Intercontinental Cup against a Zimbabwe XI in which Afghanistan drew the match.  Later, in November 2009 he was a member of Afghanistan's 2009 ACC Twenty20 Cup winning squad.

Ahmadzai made his full Twenty20 International debut against Ireland in the 2010 Quadrangular Twenty20 Series in Sri Lanka.  Later on in February 2010, Ahmadzai was a key member of Afghanistan's victorious 2010 ICC World Twenty20 Qualifier winning squad and was later named in Afghanistan's squad for the 2010 ICC World Twenty20.

In April 2010, Ahmadzai was a key member of Afghanistan's 2010 ACC Trophy Elite winning squad which defeated Nepal in the final, with Ahmadzai scoring 52 runs in Afghanistan's innings; earning him the man of the match award. Ahmadzai played in both of Afghanistan's matches in Group C of the 2010 ICC World Twenty20. In their first match of the tournament he remained unbeaten on 5 against India and against South Africa he was caught behind by Mark Boucher off the bowling of Morné Morkel. Afghanistan lost both matches and were eliminated from the tournament.

Retirement
Shortly before Afghanistan's match against South Africa, Ahmadzai announced he would retire following the match.  He stated his reason for retiring being "in order to focus on developing the younger generation of Afghan cricketers". Ahmadzai has now taken up a coaching role with the national squad as well a chief selector for the Afghanistan Cricket Board.  He is also a representative of Afghanaid. On 8th August 2020 Afghanistan Cricket Board appointed Ahmadazai as Director of Cricket.

References

External links
Raees Ahmadzai on Cricinfo
Raees Ahmadzai on CricketArchive

1984 births
Living people
People from Logar Province
Afghan cricketers
Pashtun people
Afghanistan One Day International cricketers
Afghanistan Twenty20 International cricketers
Sebastianites Cricket and Athletic Club cricketers
Afghan cricket captains
Afghan expatriates in Pakistan
Afghan cricket coaches
UNICEF Goodwill Ambassadors